Bolshekurazovo (Olo Quraz) is a rural locality (a village) in Krasnokholmsky Selsoviet, Kaltasinsky District, Bashkortostan, Russia. The population was 303 as of 2010. There are 5 streets.

Geography 
Bolshekurazovo is located 23 km northeast of Kaltasy (the district's administrative centre) by road. Malokurazovo is the nearest rural locality.

References 

Rural localities in Kaltasinsky District